The  is a river located on the western side of the island of Iriomote, one of the Yaeyama Islands of Japan.

Climate

The mean annual temperature is 23.4 °C, and the mean annual rainfall during the period 1979 to 2000 was 2342 mm / year.

Environment

The river's estuary and shoreline supports three mangrove species, Bruguiera gymnorhiza , Rhizophora stylosa  and Kandelia candel

References

Rivers of Okinawa Prefecture
Rivers of Japan